Songlines is a British magazine launched in 1999 that covers music from traditional and popular to contemporary and fusion, featuring artists from around the globe.

Songlines is published 10 times a year and contains CD reviews, artist interviews, guides to particular world music traditions, concert and festival listings and travel stories. Every issue comes with an accompanying compilation CD featuring sample tracks from 10 of the best new releases reviewed in that issue and five additional tracks chosen by a celebrity. A podcast containing highlights of each issue is available to download through iTunes or through the Songlines website.

The magazine is edited by Simon Broughton, co-editor of The Rough Guide to World Music.

The name was chosen based on the aboriginal mythological concept of songlines.

History
In 2008 Songlines was expanded to include Songlines Music Travel, a music tourism service offering excursions to renowned world music locations and festivals.

In 2009 Songlines launched Songlines Digital, an online subscription version of the magazine.

Mark Allen Group acquired Songlines in 2015.

Songlines Music Awards
In 2009, Songlines launched their Music Awards to replace the cancelled BBC Radio 3 Awards for World Music World Music Awards. The Songlines award is granted in four  categories: Best Artist, Best Group, Best Cross-Cultural Collaboration and Best Newcomer.

Instead of the category Best Cross-Cultural Collaboration, the Songlines award was granted in 2016 in six new categories: Africa & Middle East, Americas, Asia & South Pacific, Europe, Fusion and World Pioneer Award. The winners were: Seckou Keita, Lila Downs, Debashish Bhattacharya, Sam Lee & Friends, Ballaké Sissoko & Vincent Ségal and Chris Blackwell.

See also
Awards for world music

References

External links
 Official Songlines magazine website
 Songlines Music Travel Homepage

Music magazines published in the United Kingdom
Ten times annually magazines
Magazines established in 1999
World music
World music awards
1999 establishments in the United Kingdom